Arin Joseph Hanson (born January 6, 1987), also known by the pseudonym Egoraptor, is an American YouTuber, actor, rapper, and animator. He is well-known for his Flash cartoons, as well as being the co-founder and co-star of the popular YouTube Let's Play series Game Grumps.

Hanson has created numerous shorts and web series on Newgrounds and YouTube, including The Awesome Series, which parodies video game franchises like Pokémon and Metal Gear, and Sequelitis, a series of animated video essays in which he humorously compares a video game and one of its sequels. He has also voice-acted for television and video games. He regularly collaborates with Ninja Sex Party, a musical comedy duo consisting of Game Grumps co-host Dan Avidan and Brian Wecht, with whom he formed the video game-based parody musical trio Starbomb.

Early life
Arin Hanson was born to Lloyd and Maurette Hanson on January 6, 1987, in Margate, Florida. For a few years, his family lived in New Hampshire, however Hanson largely grew up in Florida. From an early age, he had an interest in art and experimented with stop motion animation. Hanson's mother pulled him out of high school following the first day of his junior year after he had moved; he instead pursued and received a GED.

Career

Animation

Hanson joined Newgrounds under the name "Egoraptor" on September 16, 2001. He released his first animation on DeviantArt, titled "Final Fantasy 7 Flash Spoof", on September 18, 2004. He submitted his first Awesome animation, "Metal Gear Awesome," to Newgrounds on February 23, 2006. Hanson went on to upload other comedic video game-related animations, as well as four separate animated webseries (which he then uploaded to YouTube later on); Awesome, short animated videos that parody video games, Lemon 'n Bill, a comedic series in which an anthropomorphic bullet and lemon get trapped within video game worlds, Girlchan in Paradise, a parody of shōnen anime. After producers at MTV saw "Metal Gear Awesome", Hanson was then approached by the channel to produce animated shorts for MTV's online gaming show, The G-Hole.

Hanson continued animating through the early 2010s with Sequelitis, a series in which Hanson compares a video game and its sequel along with animations throughout the video. A fourth and final episode of the series was released in 2014. According to fellow animator and Game Grumps alumnus Ross O'Donovan, changes to YouTube made it increasingly difficult to support animation channels from the mid-2010s. Even though, Hanson has expressed that he misses animating. In 2015, Hanson expressed his condolences to RWBY creator Monty Oum after his death, considering him an influence on his animation.

Voice acting
In 2006, Hanson starred as the sole voice actor in the animated short J.I.M. on Newgrounds, created by Lee McGuire.

In 2006, Hanson got his very first role in voice acting as the voice of Bruce Banner in the video game Marvel: Ultimate Alliance. However, after doing his voice work, Hanson's voice went ultimately unused, and the character was played by Robin Atkin Downes instead for unknown reasons, although his voice was used in the Wii port.
Hanson's voice would later go on to be used in the 2016 re-release of Marvel: Ultimate Alliance, in place of Robin Atkin Downes.

In 2009, Hanson provided the voice for the character John Gore in the video game Minigore, and later reprised the role in the 2011 remake of Death Rally.

In 2012, Hanson provided his voice for the game Detective Grimoire, a Kickstarter project which was successfully funded on August 3, 2012. Hanson has also voiced various characters for Hex Heroes, Dragon Age: Inquisition, Target Acquired, Red vs. Blue, Cyanide & Happiness, and Rick and Morty.

Since 2016, Hanson has been a regular on Cartoon Network's Mighty Magiswords providing the voice of Gateaux, the monosyllabic partner of sorceress Moribidia, played by Mary Faber. He also plays other recurring characters such as Fibby Croax, Delivery Man Steve, Zonq, as well as many other various additional characters. According to series creator, Kyle Carrozza, Hanson was originally approached for character design on the show, but he declined. Although aware of his voice work, Carrozza was not aware of Hanson's SAG-AFTRA membership until he informed him, which led to him being cast on the show.

In 2016, Hanson was added as an Announcer in Move or Die.

Game Grumps

In July 2012, Hanson and his colleague Jon Jafari (known for his comedy webseries JonTron) created a joint YouTube channel, called Game Grumps. In late June 2013, Dan Avidan, of the band Ninja Sex Party, replaced Jafari when he retired Game Grumps to focus on his personal channel. On Game Grumps, Hanson and Avidan play video games and talk, to an often comedic effect. Hanson has also appeared on the channel's spin-off shows Steam Train and GrumpCade, along with other Game Grumps members in a similar format to the parent show; he and Avidan also front the 10 Minute Power Hour, in which they engage in various activities.

The popularity of Game Grumps led to live performances at the Hollywood Improv in late March 2016. Completely sold out, the event led to future performances in New York and other locations on the East Coast, which itself led to further shows across the United States and internationally through their own touring company.

Collaborations

In 2008, Hanson worked together with Ross O'Donovan on the animated webseries Gamer Tonight where he provided the voice of the host, which was broadcast on the Australian television show Good Game. He also voiced a character in asdfmovie4 in 2011, a series by TomSka.

In February 2012, Hanson appeared as a contestant on the Sony game show, The Tester, during its third season, as a community-voted contestant, but was falsely accused of using the show to promote himself. He later admitted that he applied in order to spite a former bully, while on the show itself he behaved in a way he described as actively trolling it, until he was reprimanded on camera. When asked about his experience, and whether or not he would do it again, he replied negatively. Hanson won the third season of the dance competition web series Dance Showdown, alongside professional dancer, Maxine Hupy. Hanson has also done narration work for several episodes of Did You Know Gaming? Besides providing additional work for online series on YouTube and Newgrounds, Hanson has been featured in several videos for the website ScrewAttack, including a collaboration with James Rolfe and Keith Apicary.

In May 2022, Hanson fought against Harley Morenstein of Epic Meal Time in a boxing match which was part of the charity event Creator Clash, hosted by fellow content creator iDubbbz.

Music

In 2013, Hanson performed the introduction to a version of "Knight in Shining Armour" by Dougal and Gammer released as part of the compilation Clubland X-Treme Hardcore 9.

In 2013, Hanson, along with Game Grumps co-host and Ninja Sex Party singer-songwriter Dan Avidan and instrumentalist Brian Wecht, formed the band Starbomb. They released their first album, named Starbomb in December 2013, which went on to become No. 1 on the Billboard Comedy Charts. Starbomb went on to release their second album one year later December 2014, titled Player Select. In early 2016, Hanson performed with Starbomb at their first live event at SXSW.

On April 15, 2014, Fat Refund, a rap song, was released on the channel StamperTV, a collaboration between several animators and voice actors including Rice Pirate, Marc M., Stamper, and Hanson himself.

Hanson has also provided some spoken vocals for several songs by the band Tupper Ware Remix Party.

Starbomb released their third studio album, The TryForce, on April 19, 2019.

Other work
In 2013, Hanson made an appearance on the webseries Hot Pepper Gaming. He reviewed Monster Hunter 3 Ultimate after eating a habanero pepper. In 2014, he returned to the show, reviewing the game Metal Gear Solid V: Ground Zeroes whilst eating a Bhut jolokia. In 2015, Hanson again appeared on the show, reviewing the game Metal Gear Solid V: The Phantom Pain whilst consuming Sichuan peppers.

Hanson also starred alongside Avidan in Good Game, a YouTube Original Series. In addition to acting in the series, Hanson also served as an executive producer.

In January 2018, Hanson and Game Grumps manager Brent Lilley co-founded tour management company Real Good Touring, which organizes tours for internet personalities and independent performers.

Hanson's channel name "Egoraptor" has been featured as a cheat code in the 2019 Metroidvania game Bloodstained: Ritual of the Night, along with several other prominent YouTube personalities.

In March 2020, Hanson released his first novel Ghost Hunters Adventure Club and the Secret of the Grande Chateau, under the pen-name "Dr. Cecil H. H. Mills" (proclaimed by Hanson to be his uncle, and a controversial literary figure, but obviously portrayed by Hanson himself in interviews and advertisements).

Personal life
Hanson met his wife, Suzanne "Suzy" Berhow (born July 3, 1989), at a convention in 2002 and the two started dating some years later. Hanson proposed to her in 2011, and they married on October 25, 2013, at the Natural History Museum of Los Angeles County. Berhow uses the pseudonym Mortem3r online and has her own gaming channel titled KittyKatGaming, in which Hanson is often featured.

In July 2009, Hanson moved from his parents' house in West Palm Beach, Florida, to California. He currently lives with Berhow in Glendale, California.

Hanson's mother is a licensed equine therapist and is the Executive Director of Healing Horse Therapy Center. He has an older brother, Nate Hanson, who is a veteran of the US Air Force.

Boxing record

Filmography

Film

Television

Web series

Video games

1Hanson's dialogue was recorded for the original 2006 release. Although he was replaced by Robin Atkin Downes in the final game, his dialogue was used for the 2016 re-release on PC, PS4 and Xbox One.

Discography

Starbomb

Starbomb (2013)
Player Select (2014)
The TryForce (2019)

Guest appearances
 Ninja Sex Party – "Dinosaur Laser Fight" (2011)
 Dougal and Gammer – "Knight in Shining Armour" (2013)
 Geezy – "Hashtag" (2013)
 StamperTV – "FAT REFUND" (2014)
 Ninja Sex Party – "Party of Three" (2015)
 Ninja Sex Party – "Buttsex Goldilocks" (2015)
 Ninja Sex Party – "6969" (2015)
 Big Bad Bosses – "Intro" (2015)
Tupper Ware Remix Party – "Groove Crusaders" (2016)
 Tupper Ware Remix Party – "Atomic Karate" (2017)
 Ninja Sex Party – "Eating Food in the Shower" (2017)
 Tupper Ware Remix Party – "Phantom Racer" (2018)
 Ninja Sex Party – "Release the Kraken" (2018)
 Ninja Sex Party – "Ninja Brian Goes to Soccer Practice" (2018)
 Ninja Sex Party – "Danny Don't You Know" (2018)
 NateWantsToBattle – "Sonic Forces - Infinite Theme (ft. Arin Hanson)" (2018)
Tupper Ware Remix Party – "Hidden Potential" (2019)
 NateWantsToBattle – "In the End (Linkin Park cover ft. Arin Hanson)" (2020)

Bibliography

Illustrator

See also
 List of YouTubers
 Adobe Flash

References

External links

 
 

1987 births
Living people
21st-century American comedians
21st-century American rappers
American comedy musicians
American male video game actors
American male voice actors
American media critics
American music video directors
American people of English descent
American rappers
American baritones
American YouTubers
Animators from Florida
Comedians from Florida
Comedy YouTubers
Gaming YouTubers
Maker Studios people
YouTube channels launched in 2006
People from Margate, Florida
People from Wellington, Florida
Polaris channels
Starbomb members
Surreal comedy
Video game commentators
Video game critics
Web series producers
YouTube animators
YouTube critics and reviewers
Newgrounds people
Flash artists
YouTube boxers